Agada is a rural locality (a selo) in Tlogobsky Selsoviet, Gunibsky District, Republic of Dagestan, Russia. The population was 42 as of 2010.

Geography 
Agada is located 44 km northwest of Gunib (the district's administrative centre) by road, on the Kudiyabor River. Agada and Egeda are the nearest rural localities.

References 

Rural localities in Gunibsky District